The Copa América is South America's major tournament in senior men's football and determines the continental champion. Until 1967, the tournament was known as "South American Championship". It is the oldest continental championship in the world with its first edition held in 1916.

Argentina has won the tournament fifteen times, the joint-record holder with Uruguay. However, they do lead the all-time table, have the highest number of victories and hold various other records.

Argentina are the only team to win the title three consecutive times (1945–1947). The last time they won the tournament was in 2021. In 2015 and 2016, they proceeded to the final, only to lose to Chile in a penalty shoot-out on both occasions, even though they have never once lost to Chile over regular time in tournament history (28 matches).

Overall record

Winning finals

In the era of the South American Championship, Round robins were more commonly played than knock-out tournaments. Listed are the decisive matches which secured Argentina the respective titles.

Record by opponent

Argentina has only positive head-to-head-records at the Copa América. Four out of nine CONMEBOL-members have never beaten the Albiceleste in regular time in a combined 74 attempts.

* includes a 0–0 draw awarded to Argentina in 1942.

Record players

Seven Argentinian players have won the South American Championship three times each. Manuel Seoane (1925, 1927 and 1929) also won the title as coach in 1937. The others are Vicente de la Mata (1937, 1945, 1946), José Salomón (1941, 1945, 1946), Mario Boyé, Félix Loustau, Norberto Méndez and René Pontoni (all 1945, 1946, 1947).

Top goalscorers

Awards and records

Team awards
 Champions (15): 1921, 1925, 1927, 1929, 1937, 1941, 1945, 1946, 1947, 1955, 1957, 1959 (Argentina), 1991, 1993, 2021
 Runners-up (14): 1916, 1917, 1920, 1923, 1924, 1926, 1935, 1942, 1959 (Ecuador), 1967, 2004, 2007, 2015, 2016
 Third place (5): 1919, 1956, 1963, 1989, 2019
 Fair Play Award: 2016

Individual awards
 MVP 1921: Américo Tesoriere
 MVP 1925: Manuel Seoane
 MVP 1929: Manuel Ferreira
 MVP 1937: Vicente de la Mata
 MVP 1946: Adolfo Pedernera
 MVP 1947: José Manuel Moreno
 MVP 1957: Enrique Sívori
 MVP 1991: Leonardo Rodríguez
 MVP 1993: Sergio Goycochea
 MVP 2021: Lionel Messi
 Top scorer 1921: Julio Libonatti (3 goals)
 Top scorer 1922: Julio Francia (4 goals)
 Top scorer 1923: Vicente Aguirre (3 goals) (shared)
 Top scorer 1925: Manuel Seoane (6 goals)
 Top scorer 1927: Alfredo Carricaberry and Segundo Luna (3 goals each) (shared)
 Top scorer 1935: Herminio Masantonio (4 goals)
 Top scorer 1941: Juan Marvezzi (5 goals)
 Top scorer 1942: Herminio Masantonio and José Moreno (7 goals each) (shared)
 Top scorer 1945: Norberto Méndez (6 goals) (shared)
 Top scorer 1955: Rodolfo Micheli (8 goals)
 Top scorer 1957: Humberto Maschio (9 goals) (shared)
 Top scorer 1959 (Ecuador): José Sanfilippo (6 goals)
 Top scorer 1967: Luis Artime (5 goals)
 Top scorer 1975: Leopoldo Luque (4 goals) (shared)
 Top scorer 1983: Jorge Burruchaga (3 goals) (shared)
 Top scorer 1991: Gabriel Batistuta (6 goals)
 Top scorer 1995: Gabriel Batistuta (4 goals) (shared)
 Top scorer 2021: Lionel Messi (4 goals) (shared)
 Best young player 2007: Lionel Messi
 Best goalkeeper 2021: Emiliano Martínez

In 2015, no award for Most Valuable Player was given after Lionel Messi reportedly rejected it.

Team records

 Most victories (120)
 Most goals (455)
 Most consecutive titles (3, 1945–1947)
 Highest victory (12–0 over Ecuador on 22 January 1942)

Individual records

 Most goals: Norberto Méndez (17, shared with Zizinho)
 Most assists: Lionel Messi (17)
 Most assists in a single tournament: Lionel Messi (5, 2021)
 Most man of the match awards: Lionel Messi (14)
 Most man of the match awards in a single tournament: Lionel Messi (4, 2015 and 2021)
 Most matches: Lionel Messi (34, shared with Sergio Livingstone)
 Most titles as manager: Guillermo Stábile (6 titles)

References

External links
RSSSF archives and results
Soccerway database

 
Countries at the Copa América
Argentina national football team